Events in the year 1923 in China.

Incumbents
President: Li Yuanhong (until 13 June), Gao Lingwei (14 June – 10 October), Cao Kun (from 10 October)
Premier: Wang Zhengting (until 4 January), Zhang Shaozeng (4 January – 9 September), Gao Lingwei (from 9 September)

Events
 January – Establishment of Radio Corporation of China
 26 January – Sun–Joffe Manifesto
 5 October – presidential election
 27 December – Establishment of the Prefecture Apostolic of Tingchow
 Establishment of the 3rd Central Executive Committee of the Chinese Communist Party
 Establishment of First United Front
 Establishment of Jiangsu Tongzhou High School, in Nantong, Jiangsu
 Establishment of Kunming Wujiaba International Airport, in Kunming, Yunnan

Births 
 Chen Nengkuan
 Fu Quanxiang
 Li Wanheng
 Li Yuan-tsu
 Wang Shufeng
 Yang Guanghua
 Yang Jingyuan

Deaths 

 Zhou Ziqi
 Chen Xiefen
 Fang Junying (1884–1923), was a Chinese revolutionary, killed herself due to sorrow over the level of corruption in the government

References

 
1920s in China
Years of the 20th century in China